Gyovren is a village under the municipality of Devin in the Smolyan Province in the southern part of Bulgaria.

Geography 
Gyovren is located in the Rhodope Mountains on the northern slope of the Trigrad plateau, not far from the Bulgaria–Greece border. It is located 20 km south of the town of Devin between the villages of Teshel and Trigrad and 143 km from the national capital Sofia. It is a typical high-mountain village situated on a steep rocky relief. West of the village flows the Trigrad River and there lies the Trigrad Gorge. Along the road at the foot of the village is a mosque which was historically significant in the founding of the village.

Culture 
The population of Gyovren is mainly ethnic Turks. The village celebrates many old traditions and holidays such as Ramazan Bayrami, Kurban Bayram, Ashure and Aderlez.

Attractions 
The mountains surrounding Gyovren are full of rich natural wildlife. The natural reserve, "Kazanite", is home to pine and spruce trees from over 80–100 years ago.  Local wildlife in the reserve include deer, wild goats, and wild pigs. There are also a few dairy farms, "mandras," in the mountains where sheep milk, white cheese ("sirene"), kashkaval, and butter are processed manually during the summer months using centuries-old techniques.

Gyovren is also located between the Devil's Throat Cave and Yagodinska Cave.

There are also a number of guest houses located in the village and open for tourists throughout the year.

Gallery

References 

 Gyovren at Guide Bulgaria
 A video about a mixed couple from Gyovren

Villages in Smolyan Province